Ethyl Spraggins Ayler (May 1, 1930 – November 18, 2018) was an American character actress with a career spanning over five decades.

Biography
Ayler was born in Whistler, Alabama and graduated from Fisk University.

In 1957, she made her off-Broadway debut in the Langston Hughes musical, Simply Heavenly. Later that year, she debuted on Broadway in the multiple Tony Award-nominated musical, Jamaica as an understudy for Lena Horne (also making her Broadway debut).

Another notable early performance was in Jean Genet's play, The Blacks: A Clown Show, which ran off-Broadway for 1,408 performances and received three Obie Awards, including Best New Play. The impressive cast of black actors included three future Academy Award nominees: James Earl Jones, Cicely Tyson and  Louis Gossett Jr.

Throughout her career, Ayler appeared frequently with the Negro Ensemble Company. This included notable performances in The First Breeze of Summer, Eden and Nevis Mountain Dew.

On television, Ayler had a recurring role as Carrie Hanks, Clair Huxtable's mother on The Cosby Show. She also made memorable performances in the films To Sleep with Anger (1990) and Eve's Bayou (1997).

For her work in To Sleep with Anger, Ayler received a nomination for the Independent Spirit Award for Best Supporting Female.

Ayler's last Broadway appearance was in another Tony-nominated production, The Little Foxes, in 1997. On November 18, 2018, she died in Loma Linda, California, at the age of 88.

Selected credits

Theatre

Film

References

External links
 
 
 
 Ethel Ayler at the Internet Theatre Database

1930 births
2018 deaths
20th-century American actresses
21st-century American actresses
Actresses from Alabama
Actresses from New York City
People from Prichard, Alabama
African-American actresses
American television actresses
American film actresses
American musical theatre actresses
20th-century African-American women singers
American stage actresses
Fisk University alumni
21st-century African-American women
21st-century African-American people